Stargard is the self titled debut album of the girl group Stargard released in 1978 by MCA Records. The album reached No. 12 on the Billboard Top R&B Albums chart and No. 26 on the Billboard 200 chart.

Overview
The album was produced by Mark Davis.

Singles
The song, "Which Way Is Up" reached No. 1 on the Billboard Hot R&B Singles chart, No. 12 on the Billboard Dance Club chart and No. 21 on the Hot 100. It peaked at No. 19 on the UK Singles Chart.

Track listing

References

1978 debut albums
MCA Records albums
Soul albums by American artists